Janet Christine Harville (born February 19, 1952) is an American rower.

College and later rowing
Harville rowed at the University of Washington from 1970 to 1973, winning an AIAW silver medal in pairs in 1972.  She earned a degree in medical technology in 1974.

She was a member of the United States national team from 1978 to 1984 and competed at the World Championships in 1978–1979 and 1982–1983. Harville was also a member of the 1980 US Olympic Team. She competed in the women's coxed four event at the 1984 Summer Olympics.

Coaching
Harville became an assistant coach at Washington in 1980, then became head coach in 1988. She led the Huskies through the 2003 season, winning NCAA titles in 1997, 1998, and 2001. A nine-time Pac-10 Coach of the Year, Harville was also national rowing coach of the year in 2002. Harville coached U.S. teams at the World Championships from 1987 to 1999.

References

External links
 

1952 births
Living people
American female rowers
Olympic rowers of the United States
Rowers at the 1984 Summer Olympics
Rowers from Seattle
Washington Huskies women's rowing coaches
21st-century American women